A metalhead is a member of the heavy metal subculture.

Metalhead may also refer to:

Music
 Metalhead (album), 1999 album by Saxon
 "Metalhead", a song by Blotto
 "Metalhead", a song from the 2008 Miss Kittin album BatBox
 Metalheadz, an English drum and bass record label

Fiction

Films
 Metalhead (film), a 2013 Icelandic film

Characters
 Metalhead (Teenage Mutant Ninja Turtles), two characters from the Teenage Mutant Ninja Turtles franchise
 Metalhead (comics), a Marvel Comics character
 Metal-Head, a character from the G.I. Joe: A Real American Hero series

Other
 "Metalhead" (Black Mirror), an episode of anthology series Black Mirror
 Metalheads (TV series), British animated series
 Metal Head, a 3D first-person shooter mecha simulation video game